The Clare Drake Award is the annual "Rookie of the Year" award presented to the U Sports men's ice hockey player who is judged by a committee of the U Sports Men's Hockey Coaches Association to be "the most outstanding first-year player in the U Sports who has exhibited exemplary skill and leadership".

First awarded following the 1985-86 season, the award is named after Clare Drake, who is the coach with the most wins in U Sports men's hockey history.

Winners
1985-86: 		Claude Lefebvre (Forward)
1989-90: 		Wayne Hynes (Centre) 		
1992-93: 		John Spoltore (Centre) 	
1993-94: 		Jarret Zukiwsky (Right Wing) 
1994-95: 		Sylvain Rodrigue (Goaltender) 	
1995-96: 		Jason Becker (Defenceman) 	
1997-98: 		Ryan Lindsay (Centre) 		
1998-99: 		Eric Schneider (Forward) 	
1999-00: 		Clayton Pool (Goaltender) 	
2000-01: 		Alexandre Tremblay (Left Wing) 		
2001-02: 		Matt Dzieduszycki (Forward) 		
2002-03: 		Dean Beuker (Right Wing) 	
2003-04: 		Kevin Young (Defenceman) 	
2004-05: 		Mathieu Poitras (Goaltender) 	
2005-06: 		Aaron Sorochan (Goaltender) 		
2006-07: 		Mark Shefchyk (Left Wing) 		
2007-08: 		Craig Voakes (Left Wing) 		
2008-09: 		Steve DaSilva (Right Wing) 	
2009-10: 		Jared Gomes (Centre) 	
2010-11:		Jason Bast (Centre) 		
2011-12:		Zach Harnden (Right Wing) 	
2012-13:		Mitchell Porowski (Left Wing) 	
2013-14:		Kevin Bailie (Goaltender) 	
2014-15:		Spencer Abraham (Defenceman) 	
2015-16:		Brett Welychka (Centre) 	
2016-17:		Anthony DeLuca (Left Wing)

References
CIS Past Awards

U Sports ice hockey trophies and awards